Houppeville is a commune in the Seine-Maritime department in the Normandy region in northern France.

Geography

Heraldry

Population

Places of interest
 The church of Notre-Dame, dating from the eleventh century.
 The Arboretum de Forêt Verte

See also
Communes of the Seine-Maritime department

References

External links

Unofficial website of the commune 

Communes of Seine-Maritime